Archeological Sites at Kawela are a number of archeological sites at or near the settlement of Kawela on the southern coast of Molokai, the northernmost of the islands of Maui County, Hawaii. It was the site of two battles in Hawaiian history.

Early history
Ka Wela means "the heat" in the Hawaiian language. It was the name of a traditional land division (ahupuaa) of ancient Hawaii, but the name is also used on several other islands.

This is generally thought to be the place of refuge (Puuhonua) where the soldiers of Kapiioho o kalani fled during a great battle of about 1737.

In about February 1795, women and children escaped to Molokai when Kamehameha I had just conquered Maui. In pursuit, the vast fleet of war canoes stretched all along the coast from Kawela past Kaunakakai to the area known as Kalamaula. The army met little resistance this time. Queen Kalola was asked if the two kingdoms could be united by marrying off her daughter Keōpūolani, who was considered to have the best royal family background, and thus would be suitable as a mother of future rulers. Her sons and grandsons would rule the Kingdom of Hawaii as the House of Kamehameha.
In the late 19th century it was part of the vast Molokai Ranch owned by King Kamehameha V and managed by the family of Rudolph Wilhelm Meyer.

Recent history

The area now has a few vacation homes along the shore, and one subdivision of 120  lots that are zoned for agriculture on the hills. Wadsworth Y. H. Yee, in the Hawaii Senate from the Republican Party of Hawaii proposed the development in the 1970s. Ground was broken on December 20, 1980.

Wetlands and an ancient fishpond near the shore are preserved in the Kakahaia National Wildlife Refuge and Kakahaia park administered by Maui County.

There are 21 which are separately listed on the National Register of Historic Places. 
The names used in the NRHP all start with the words "Archeological Site" and then an optional list of site numbers from a survey done by the Bernice Pauahi Bishop Museum when the development was proposed  with a letter "T" followed by a dash, and then a state site identifier which four numbers separated with dashes, starting with "50-60" indicating the 50th state of Hawaii and the county of Maui County, a map quadrant, and site within the state registry. 
The sites are scattered through the area, and are located on private property so generally not accessible to the public.

The sites are:

References

Heiau
Molokai
Archaeological sites on the National Register of Historic Places in Hawaii
Protected areas of Molokai
Buildings and structures in Maui County, Hawaii
National Register of Historic Places in Maui County, Hawaii
Hawaii Register of Historic Places